The 1962-63 French Rugby Union Championship  was contested by 56 teams divided in 7 pools.

The four first teams of each pool and the better fourclassified fifth were qualified for the "last 32".

The Mont-de-Marsan won the Championship 1962-63 after beating l'Dax in the final. For the first time from 1934, the final opposes two teams of the same department (The Landes).

Context 
The 1963 Five Nations Championship was won by Ireland, France finished second.

The Challenge Yves du Manoir was won by Agen that beat Brive par 11 - 0.

Qualification round 

In bold the qualified to "last 32" phase

"Last 32" 

In bold the clubs qualified for the next round

Le SU Agen, champion sortant and winner du Challenge Yves du Manoir, was eliminateddès The "last 32" phases par Chalon.

"Last 16" 

In bold the clubs qualified for the next round

Quarter of finals 

In bold the clubs qualified for the next round

Semifinals

Final 

Lestage score the decisive drop at minute 75th : It was the first and only victory of the "permet au Stade montois" and the third final lost by US Dax.

External links 
 Compte rendu finale de 1963 lnr.fr
 Finale 1963 finalesrugby.com

1963
France 1963
Championship